Secret Garden is the eighth full-length studio album by Brazilian progressive/power metal band Angra, released on 17 December 2014 in Japan and with a release date of January 2015 in Brazil and Europe. It is band's first album with singer Fabio Lione and drummer Bruno Valverde, as well as the last to feature lead guitarist Kiko Loureiro, who left to join Megadeth. The album also features lead vocals by rhythm guitarist Rafael Bittencourt and guest performances by Simone Simons from Epica and Doro Pesch.

Regarding the album, Loureiro commented in June 2014:

Track listing

Personnel 
 Angra
 Fabio Lione - lead vocals (tracks 1–5, 8, and 10)
 Kiko Loureiro - lead guitar, backing vocals, keyboard arrangements
 Rafael Bittencourt - rhythm guitar, lead vocals (on tracks 4–6, 9, and 11), backing vocals, keyboards arrangements, acoustic guitar, artwork co-conception
 Felipe Andreoli - bass, backing vocals, additional rhythm guitar
 Bruno Valverde - drums

Guest appearances
Simone Simons (Epica) - vocals on "Secret Garden"
Doro Pesch - vocals on "Crushing Room"

Production
 Jens Bogren - production, recording
 Roy Z - pre-production
 Rodrigo Bastos Didier - artwork conception and creation

Charts

References

External links

Angra (band) albums
2014 albums
Albums produced by Jens Bogren